{{Infobox album
| name         = Simple Lang
| type         = studio
| artist       = Ariel Rivera
| cover        = 
| released     = 1992 (Philippines)
| recorded     = 1991—1992
| venue        = 
| studio       = 
| genre        = OPM/R&B
| length       = 
| label        = Musiko Records & BMG Records (Pilipinas) Inc.
| producer     = 
| prev_title   = Ariel Rivera 
| prev_year    = 1991
| year         = 1992
| next_title   = Photograph 
| next_year    = 1995
}}Simple Lang'' is the second album by Ariel Rivera. It was quickly released after his successful self-titled debut album. The album sold platinum.

Track listing
Simple Lang (Vehnee Saturno)
Pinilit Kong Limutin Ka (Butch Bautista, Doris Estallo)
Sana'y Nandoon Ka (Nonoy Tan)
Without Your Love (Freddie Saturno, Tito Cayamanda)
Pag-ibig Kong Totoo (Ryan Cayabyab)
Wala Kang Katulad (Cayabyab)
Minsan Lang Kitang Iibigin (Aaron Paul del Rosario)
Laging Ikaw (Saturno)
Ito Na Kaya (Lisa Diy)
Don't Give Me Your Promises (Alvina Eileen Sy)

References

1992 albums
Ariel Rivera albums